Fraser James Macgregor Brown (born 20 June 1989) is a Scotland international rugby union player. He currently plays for Glasgow Warriors in the United Rugby Championship. He plays as a hooker or in the back row.

Rugby union career

Amateur career

Brown captained his school rugby union team, Merchiston Castle School in 2006.

Dropped by Edinburgh in 2011, Brown worked on the family farm in Carstairs and played for Heriot's Rugby Club.

Brown has been drafted to Glasgow Hawks in the Scottish Premiership for the 2017-18 season.

Professional career

In 2010, Brown was selected to play for Edinburgh in the 2010–11 Celtic League, but did not earn a cap.

Glasgow Warriors head coach Gregor Townsend recruited Brown in 2013 following injuries in the squad. He made his debut against Italian side Zebre.

International career

Fraser Brown has represented Scotland at many levels. He debuted for the Scotland Under 18s in 2007. In 2008, he was selected for the Scotland under-20s squad for the 2008 under-20s Six Nations, playing all five rounds. He was announced as captain for the 2009 season, and led the Scots to an 18–17 victory over Wales in the opening round of the 2009 under-20s Six Nations. He continued as captain going into the 2009 IRB Junior World Championship, the side eventually finishing ninth.

During Scotland's participation in the South African Quadrangular Series in 2013, Brown earned a late call up to the senior squad following an injury to fellow club player Pat MacArthur. He was a replacement for the test against South Africa, but failed to come off the bench during the match. However, Brown came off the bench the week after to earn his first cap against Italy.

References

External links
 

1989 births
Living people
Scottish rugby union players
Scotland international rugby union players
Rugby union hookers
Glasgow Warriors players
People educated at Merchiston Castle School
Rugby union players from Edinburgh
Scotland international rugby sevens players
Glasgow Hawks players
Heriot's RC players
Male rugby sevens players
Scotland Club XV international rugby union players
Edinburgh Rugby players